Wolf Racing Cars is an Italian racing car constructor based in the Province of Brescia. It was founded in 2009 after Avelon Formula purchased the rights of Walter Wolf Racing.

History

After purchasing Walter Wolf Racing trademarks, Avelon Formula focused on the development of a group CN racing car that turned out to be very successful. In 2010, the works team Avelon Formula made its debut in the Italian Prototypes Championship with the driver Ivan Bellarosa, who won the first race and dominated the season clinching the title.

In 2011, Wolf debuted in Europe at the Speed EuroSeries and in the V de V Proto Endurance Series, while also contesting the Italian Prototypes Championship. The Wolf GB08 pushed by a Honda K20A engine unit won the Speed EuroSeries Championship with Ivan Bellarosa taking 6 wins. Ivan Bellarosa won also the Speed EuroSeries again in 2012, as Wolf Racing Cars started its activity in endurance races taking part in the 24 Hours of Zolder and in the 12 Hours of Abu Dhabi.

In 2013, Wolf Racing Cars won the Portuguese CISP and the Austro-German SCC, Division 2. The focus of the company moved therefore towards the International market with the manufacturing of some new models and the production of hill climb cars. The Wolf GB08 F1 was therefore created and obtained the FIA Formula 1 2005 homologation.  At the end of the year, Wolf Racing Cars announced a sporting program in the United Sports Car Racing Series for season 2014. The car was powered by a BMW engine.

Season 2015 was important for the Italian company by winning the Belgian Belcar and Endurance Champions Cup with its challengers. They also won the 6 Hours of Rome at the Autodromo di Vallelunga.

In 2016, Wolf Racing Cars began development work on a new 1.6 Turbo power unit and on May, 29th at Autodromo Enzo e Dino Ferrari in Imola a Wolf GB08 became the first CN-Turbo approved sports car to win a competition. During the year the Wolf's two-seater repeats the victory in the Endurance Champions Cup, while in the United States John Morris and Ron Eckardt obtained several successes in the series of Spring Mountain Racing (SMMR), allowing Ron Eckardt to be crowned champion with his Wolf GB08 SM in the LSR2 class.

The big news of 2017 is the Wolf GB08 Tornado, a new two-seater Sports Car that debuted in March in Australia. Ivan Bellarosa to become Champion of the Italian Prototypes Championship 2017 with 11 victories on 12 races. The Tornado was in several endurance competitions including the 3h of Imola, showing strong performance compared to LMP3 class cars. At the 6 hours of Rome the Wolf GB08 Tornado got Wolf Racing Cars their 100th pole position.

The successful results obtained in 2017 allowed Wolf Racing Cars to win the tender to become the official provider of the new Italian Prototypes Championship for five years between 2018–2022.

Cars

Wolf Racing Cars has produced several sport prototype cars since 2009 including single seaters and double seaters featuring different engines. The most recent car is the Wolf GB08 Tornado that won the Italian Prototypes Championship 2017.

Hall of Fame

Wolf Racing Cars has claimed several wins not only in Europe, where it has mainly focused its sporting activity so far, but also in Saudi Arabia, Japan, Thailand and United States of America. Wolf Racing Cars challengers have been especially successful in endurance races, that are the events they have been specifically designed for.

References

External links
 Wolf Racing Cars

Automotive motorsports and performance companies
Sports car manufacturers
Italian racecar constructors
Vehicle manufacturing companies established in 2009
Companies based in Lombardy